Vincenzo "Enzo" Iacchetti (born 31 August 1952) is an Italian stand-up comedian, actor, television presenter and singer.

Biography 
Born in Castelleone, Iacchetti graduated in accounting and then made his apprenticeship as an entertainer performing in pizzerias and in restaurants in occasion of baptisms and weddings. In 1978 he was responsible for the programming of Radio Tresa, a little radio station in Lavena, also working as a speaker and an interviewer. In 1979 he moved to Milan, where he started performing at the Derby Club alongside other future successful comedians such as Giorgio Faletti and Francesco Salvi.

In 1981 Iacchetti made his television debut, playing a series of practical jokes for the RAI show Il Sabato dello Zecchino.  After appearing in a number of other variety shows, he had his breakout in the early 1990s as a recurring guest in the Canale 5 talk show Maurizio Costanzo Show, where he became popular for his "bonsai" songs, very short humor songs usually lasting less than a minute whose lyrics were surrealistic and often nonsensical. Starting from 1994, Iacchetti got a large success as the presenter of the satirical Striscia la notizia, a role he reprised in the following seasons. In 1995, he made his debut as lead actor in the film Come quando fuori piove.

In 2009, he provided the voice for an amnesiac SpongeBob SquarePants in the Italian dub of the eponymous animated series' episode "What Ever Happened to SpongeBob?"

References

External links 

 
 

1952 births
Living people
People from Castelleone
Italian male film actors
Italian male stage actors
Italian male television actors
Italian comedians
Italian television presenters